Mid-Indiana Football Conference is a six-member Indiana High School Athletic Association sanctioned football-only Conference in South Central and Southeast Indiana.

Members 

 Edinburgh played from 2011 until 2016 as an independent.
 Milan played concurrently in the EIAC and MIFC for the 1981 season.

Former members

Champions 

 Milan and Brown County both finished with 2-0 records in a partial schedule. Edinburgh was the only team to play a full schedule.
 North Decatur (5-1) and Indian Creek (4-1) both finished with one loss, but Indian Creek and Milan didn't play. North Decatur won the title based on beating Indian Creek.

Resources 
 IHSAA Conferences
 IHSAA Directory

Indiana high school athletic conferences
High school sports conferences and leagues in the United States